Cadences obstinées (Portuguese: Cadências Obstinadas) is a 2013 French-Portuguese romance film directed by Fanny Ardant.

Cast
Asia Argento as Margo
Nuno Lopes as Furio
Franco Nero as Carmine
Tudor Istodor as Gabriel
Ricardo Pereira as Mattia
Johan Leysen as Wladimir
Gérard Depardieu as Father Villedieu
Mika as Lucio
Laura Soveral as Carmine's mother

Reception
In Público's Ípsilon, Luís Miguel Oliveira gave the film a rating of "mediocre" and Jorge Mourinha gave it a rating of "bad".

References

External links

2013 films
2013 romance films
French romance films
Portuguese romance films
Films produced by Paulo Branco
2010s French films